Pontiac Hotel is an historic hotel located at Oswego in Oswego County, New York.  It was built in 1912 and designed by the office of architect George B. Post (1837–1913).  It was originally a four-story, "U" shaped structure; in 1955 a one-story ballroom was added at the rear of the structure in the exterior courtyard.  It features both Classical and Mission style details.  The most distinctive interior feature is a  rotunda centrally located on the main level.  In the 1980s the structure was converted from hotel use to house 70 apartment units for the elderly.

It was listed on the National Register of Historic Places in 1983.

References

Hotel buildings on the National Register of Historic Places in New York (state)
Hotel buildings completed in 1912
Buildings and structures in Oswego County, New York
Hotels established in 1912
1912 establishments in New York (state)
National Register of Historic Places in Oswego County, New York